Temple Israel is a reform Jewish synagogue located in Westport, Connecticut. It was established in 1948. Currently, about 700 families are members of the community.

History
The congregation was founded in 1948. The temple was dedicated in May 1959.

Throughout the 1960s, under the leadership of Byron T. Rubenstein, Temple Israel became a hotbed of social change and activism, with speakers including James Baldwin, Margaret Mead and Rev. Martin Luther King Jr. In 1964, Rabbi Rubenstein protested as part of the St. Augustine movement, and was arrested along with 16 other Jewish leaders. This was the single largest mass arrest of rabbis in American history.

The synagogue was substantially renovated and expanded in 1990, more than doubling the capacity of the sanctuary. In 2002-2003, another expansion of the temple substantially expanded the religious school wing, which houses the Leo and Libby Nevas Religious School and the pre-school program.

In 2012, the temple board simultaneously announced the retirement of Rabbi Robert Orkand and Cantor Richard Silverman, as well as the departure of Associate Rabbi Alysa Mendelson Graf, Cantor Scott Harris, and Executive Director Sandy Silverstein. This wholesale staff shakeup, particularly the choice to let Rabbi Mendelson and Cantor Harris go, caused considerable controversy within the congregation. Eventually, this pressure led to the board's decision to offer an ultimately rejected extension contract to Rabbi Mendelson.

On May 12, 2015, two protesters entered Temple Israel with the intent to disrupt a luncheon. Initial reports that they were armed led to lockdowns at the temple's pre-school, as well as the nearby Coleytown Elementary and Middle Schools and the pre-school at the Unitarian Church. The protesters were arrested and charged with criminal trespass and breach of peace.

Leadership
Executive Director: Bryan Bierman, 2021 - present

Former Executive Directors

Lisa Goldberg, 2012 - 2021
Sandy Silverstein 2001-2012
Current Board President: John Kaufman

Immediate Past President: Eileen Berenyi

Clergy
Rabbis

Current Senior Rabbi: Rabbi Michael S. Friedman, 2014-present

Former Senior Rabbis
Rabbi Byron T. Rubenstein (1959-1982), notably a friend of Rev. Martin Luther King Jr., a participant in the June 1964 St. Augustine movement, and a subsequent arrestee along with 16 other Jewish leaders in the largest mass arrest of rabbis in American history
Rabbi Robert Orkand (1982-2013), former president of ARZA (2008-2012)
Rabbi Rick Shapiro (June 2013-June 2014), Interim Senior Rabbi during the search process

Current Assistant Rabbi: Rabbi Zachary Plesent, 2021-present

Notable Former Associate and Assistant Rabbis
Rabbi Jonah Pesner (1997-1999), current Director of the RAC and Senior Vice President of the URJ
Rabbi Alysa Mendelson Graf (2004-2013), longest serving assistant or associate rabbi in Temple Israel's history and current Rabbi of the Port Jewish Center in Port Washington, New York
Rabbi P.J. Schwartz, (2013-2017), now serves as Rabbi-Educator at Congregation Shir Hadash in Los Gatos, CA

Cantors

Current Cantor: Cantor Julia Cadrain 2021-present 

Former Cantors
Cantor Vicki Axe (1984-1988)
Cantor Richard Silverman (1988-2012), composer of common Reform melodies for passages and prayers including Tree of Life/Etz Chaim and Mi Chamocha
Cantor Dan Sklar (2012-2020)

Services 
Temple Israel provides a variety of meaningful opportunities for prayer, study including an early childhood program, religious school and community events.

See also
List of synagogues named Temple Israel

References

External links

Synagogues in Connecticut
Reform synagogues in Connecticut
Buildings and structures in Westport, Connecticut
Jewish organizations established in 1948
1948 establishments in Connecticut
1959 establishments in Connecticut
Synagogues completed in 1959